The 2021–22 Minnesota Duluth Bulldogs men's ice hockey season was the 78th season of play for the program. They represented the University of Minnesota Duluth in the 2021–22 NCAA Division I men's ice hockey season and for the 9th season in the National Collegiate Hockey Conference (NCHC). The Bulldogs were coached by Scott Sandelin, in his 22nd season, and played their home games at AMSOIL Arena.

Season
Fresh off of their 4th consecutive frozen four, Minnesota Duluth entered the season as one of the favorites for the National Championship. Early on, the team lived up to expectations and compiled a 6–2 record by early November with all of their games coming against ranked teams. Leading the way was junior netminder, Ryan Fanti, who had taken over the starting role the year before and seemed to be performing even better. He rang up three consecutive shutouts with the help of a lock-down defense and led the Bulldogs to a #1 ranking by the beginning of December.

Fanti's turn in goal was interrupted when he tested positive for COVID-19 and was forced to sit out a road series against Northern Michigan. With nominal backup Zach Stejskal undergoing treatment for testicular cancer, the team turned to their third goalie, Ben Patt. The redshirt senior's first career starts turned out poorly and he allowed 5 goals in both games. The losses sent UMD tumbling from the top of the national rankings and began a stretch of poor performances from the club.

Duluth got Fanti back in goal the following week and earned a split with Denver but then took a couple of weeks off for the winter break. Upon their return, the Bulldogs faced down the team that had replaced them as the #1 squad, Minnesota State. The Mavericks swept UMD in the home-and-home series, demonstrating that the Bulldogs' biggest weakness was their lack of offensive punch. The week after, the entire program was hit by COVID-19 and a series with St. Cloud State was postponed until later in the season. When the team finally got back into their routine, they were inconsistent and played .500 hockey over the next month.

Though the results weren't sterling, Minnesota Duluth benefitted from their difficult schedule and still remained well within the top-10. However, a sweep at the hands of North Dakota in mid-February put the team in a precarious position. After the losses, UMD's record stood at just 2 games over .500 and a poor performance over the remainder of their season could knock them out of the NCAA tournament. The Bulldogs split their final five games of the season, dropping the team to #10 in the rankings. While their collective heads were still above water, the Bulldogs had little margin for error and would need to defeat St. Cloud State to ensure a place in the national tournament.

NCHC Tournament
Before postseason play even began, Duluth got a leg-up on their competition when St. Cloud's starter, Dávid Hrenák, came down with pneumonia. Fanti did not play at his best but the Bulldogs' offense was able to light up the Huskies' backup and scored 9 goals in two games, their best output all season. Beginning with the semifinals, the defense returned to their early-season form and dominated the rest of the tournament. UMD shut down two of the nations top offenses and captured the program's third NCHC championship. The win pushed Minnesota Duluth up to 6 in the rankings, good enough for a #2 seed in the NCAA tournament.

NCAA tournament
The Bulldogs began their run against Michigan Tech and received a boon early in the game. The Huskies' leading scorer, Brian Halonen, was called for boarding and received a controversial game-misconduct penalty. Without their top offensive threat, Tech was unable to generate much in the way of offensive chances for a majority of the game. UMD scored three unassisted goals in the game, two coming from Kobe Roth, and skated to a comfortable 3–0 victory.

UMD faced down Denver in the quarterfinals and were on the back foot almost from the start of the game. The defense did its best impression of a wall and held the Pioneers back. Duluth managed to score first on just their second shot of the period and looked to be gearing up for a 4th-consecutive shutout. Unfortunately, Fanti's streak was ended a few minutes later after a shot was deflected into the cage. Denver remained the better of the two teams for the balance of the match and stopped Duluth from gaining the lead a second time, despite the Bulldogs receiving a 5-on-3 power play in the second period. In the end it took a crazy series of bounces for the winning goal to be scored but it was Duluth that fell victim to their own mediocre offense.

Departures

Recruiting

Roster
As of August 19, 2021.

Standings

Schedule and results

|-
!colspan=12 style=";" | Exhibition

|-
!colspan=12 style=";" | Regular season

|-
!colspan=12 ! style=""; | 

|-
!colspan=12 style=";" | Regular season

|-
!colspan=12 style=";" | 

|-
!colspan=12 style=";" |

Scoring statistics

Goaltending statistics

Rankings

Note: USCHO did not release a poll in week 24.

Awards and honors

Players drafted into the NHL

2022 NHL Entry Draft

† incoming freshman

References

2021–22
Minnesota Duluth Bulldogs
Minnesota Duluth Bulldogs
Minnesota–Duluth Bulldogs
Minnesota–Duluth Bulldogs